Infinity Eighteen Vol.2 is the 3rd studio album of Japanese singer Ami Suzuki. The album held #1 on the Oricon charts and has sold a total of 427,000 copies to date. It also featured Ami's third #1 single "Thank You 4 Every Day Every Body", plus 11 additional tracks.

Information
Some time after the album was released, Ami faced legal problems with her management company, AG Communications, when the company's president, Eiji Yamada, was convicted of tax evasion. As a result of President Yamada's conviction, Sony put the album out of print along with all other Ami Suzuki singles and albums released up to that point, and she was blacklisted from the J-pop music scene.  However, after she re-debuted under Avex Trax in 2005, the album was re-released later that same year as part of her Bazooka 17 box set.

Track listing

Credits
Arranged By [Backing Vocals] – Naoki Takao (tracks: 2, 3, 6 to 9), Yuko Kawai (tracks: 2 to 11)
Directed By [Lead Vocals] – Yuko Kawai (tracks: 2 to 9)
Engineer – Gareth Ashton (tracks: 3), Hidetsugu Matsuya (tracks: 6, 8 to 11), Kenji Konishi (tracks: 2 to 11), Matt Lawrence (tracks: 1, 11, 12), Mike Butler (tracks: 1 to 3, 7, 10 to 12), Takashi Okano (tracks: 3, 7), Toshihiro Wako (tracks: 4, 5, 7, 9, 11), Ish Gonzalez* (tracks: 2, 10)
Executive Producer – Shigeo Maruyama
Mastered By – Koji Suzuki
Mixed By – Mike Butler
Producer – Tetsuya Komuro
Programmed By – Akihisa Murakami (tracks: 1 to 5, 7, 10 to 12), Reiji Matsumoto (tracks: 6, 8, 9), Toshihide Iwasa (tracks: 4, 5)
Rap - Rashawnna Guy, Lateefa Harland (tracks: 2 and 10)

Singles

References

Ami Suzuki albums
2000 albums
Albums produced by Tetsuya Komuro